A CfV (Call for Votes) is part of the Usenet decision making process. Usenet users are called upon to vote on a topical administrative issue, such as whether to create a particular newsgroup.

See also
Big-8 Management Board
Big 8 (Usenet)
Call for papers
Usenet cabal

References

Usenet